Chengzhi may refer to:
Chengzhi Co., Ltd, a Chinese technology company based in Jiangxi
Liao Chengzhi (1908-1983), Communist Party of China leader who played an important role in Sino-Japanese relations
Zhang Chengzhi (b. 1948), China's most popular Muslim writer